The Supreme Court of the United States handed down six per curiam opinions during its 2007 term, which began October 1, 2007 and concluded September 30, 2008.

Because per curiam decisions are issued from the Court as an institution, these opinions all lack the attribution of authorship or joining votes to specific justices. All justices on the Court at the time the decision was handed down are assumed to have participated and concurred unless otherwise noted.

Court membership

Chief Justice: John Roberts

Associate Justices: John Paul Stevens, Antonin Scalia, Anthony Kennedy, David Souter, Clarence Thomas, Ruth Bader Ginsburg, Stephen Breyer, Samuel Alito

Allen v. Siebert

Arave v. Hoffman

Wright v. Van Patten

Medellín v. Texas

See also 
 List of United States Supreme Court cases, volume 552
 List of United States Supreme Court cases, volume 554

Notes

References

 

United States Supreme Court per curiam opinions
Lists of 2007 term United States Supreme Court opinions
2007 per curiam